The Neurological Society of India (NSI) is the apex body representing neuroscientists of the country. It was founded in 1951 by Jacob Chandy, Balasubramaniam Ramamurthi, S. T. Narasimhan, and Baldev Singh, who together have been credited to be pioneers in development of epilepsy surgery in India.  The society appointed Jacob Chandy as its first President. The society publishes the bi-monthly journal Neurology India.

History and works 
Neurosurgeon Jacob Chandy and neurologist Baldev Singh were associated with Christian Medical College & Hospital, Vellore and physicianelectrophysiologist S. T. Narasimhan and neurosurgeon Balasubramaniam Ramamurthi were from Madras Medical College & Hospital. They together founded the society in 1951 and had its first meeting in March 1952 at Hyderabad and published its own journal dedicated to the neurosciences titled Indian JournalNeurology. There being another journal by the same name, the society decided to rename their journal to Neurology India in 1953.

Since its inception, the society held its annual meetings with the Association of Physicians of India but starting next year, it established its own annual conference and created its sub-sections of Neurology, Neurosurgery, Neuropathology and Neuroradiology in the Society. On 25 October 1969, the society registered itself with the Charity Commissioner, Public Trusts Registration Office, Greater Bombay Region (No. F-1819 (B)).

In 1972, the society formed a sub-committee for standardization of Postgraduate Education. In 1977, the society became the first medical professional society in the country to conduct the continuing medical education by providing "updates on selected topics and encouraging interdisciplinary interaction among trainees in the various branches of the Neurological Sciences". In 1979, NSI founded a new association, the Satellite Conference of Neuro-nurses of India, as its branch held with the main objective to "set high standards of neuro-nursing in the country". The conferences of the association are conducted annually along with the annual conference of NSI. In 1977, the society formed four Working Groups to deal with Medical Education and Training, Research priorities, Manpower requirements and development of Services, Community Programme, and Instrumentation along with two new sub-sections, Neurophysiology and Electroencephalography. In 1979, the Association of Neurological Nurses as another sub-section was formed and named as "Society of Indian Neurosciences Nurses (SINN)". The society formed a sub-section of Neurophysiological Technologists in 1988 and named as "Association of Neurophysiological Technologists of India (ANTI)".

The society instituted the "Dr. Jacob Chandy Oration" in 1969 and the "Dr. B. Ramamurthi Oration" in 1974, both to be held every two years along with the "Dr. R.G. Ginde Oration" in 1988, the "Dr. Baldev Singh Oration" in 1994, and the "Dr. Tandon Oration" in 1998 which are to be held every three years. Only two orations are organized during the annual conference each year and the orators are selected by the incumbent and immediate two past Presidents of the society. The society has five subspeciality societies associated with it which includes the Indian Society for Paediatric Neurosurgery, the Indian Society for Stereotactic and Functional Neurosurgery, the Skull Base Surgery Society, the Neurotraumatology Society of India, and the Cerebrovascular Society of India.

The Neurological Society of India is affiliated to the World Federation of Neurosurgical Societies, the Asian Australasian Society of Neurological Surgeons the World Federation of Neurology, the International Society of Neuropathology, the International Federation of Societies for Electroencephalography and Clinical Neurophysiology and there are two associations affiliated to the NSI, the Association of Neurological Nurses and the Association of Neurophysiological Technologists. The society has over 2000 members and has been involved in organising seminars and conferences to initiate interaction among practicing neurologists. In 2014, the society launched an awareness campaign called "Heads.. We Win" to encourage wearing of helmets, the lack of which causes major head injuries.

Presidents 
List of presidents of NSI

Lifetime Achievement Awardees 

In 2008, the society instituted a Lifetime Achievement Award and  following 21 recipients have been awarded; S. N. Bhagwati, H. M. Dastur, Prakash Narain Tandon, and Noshir Wadia in 2008, Sanatan Rath and Krishnamoorthy Srinivas in 2009, A. K. Banerji, V. S. Dave, and J. S. Chopra in 2010, R. Marthanda Varma and G. N. N. Reddy in 2011, Anupam Das Gupta and B. S. Das in 2012, B. J. Damany, V. K. Kak, and G. M. Taori in 2013 and P. S. Ramani, G. Arjun Das, S. Kalyanraman, T. S. Kanaka, and Ashru K. Banerjee in 2014 The award is conferred only on the life members of the society above the age of 75 years with the significant contribution to the development of Neurosciences in India and is presented during the inaugural function of the annual conference. In 2014, the General body of the society revised and passed its constitution and bye-laws to award only three recipients per year.

Honorary members 
Various individuals who have been associated with the society as honorary members include John A Simpson, John Walton, Baron Walton of Detchant, Theodore Rasmussen, Lindsay Simon, Majid Samii, Tetsuo Kanno, Balasubramaniam Ramamurthi, Jacob Chandy, and T. K. Ghosh.

References

External links 
 Official site

Neurology organizations
1951 establishments in India
Medical associations based in India